The 2001–02 League of Ireland Premier Division was the 17th season of the League of Ireland Premier Division. The division was made up of 12 teams. Shelbourne were crowned champions for the tenth time.

Regular season
The season saw each team playing three rounds of games, playing every other team three times, totalling 33 games. The 2002–03 season would see the League of Ireland Premier Division reduced from 12 to 10 teams. As a result, three teams were automatically relegated. 
 The season is best remembered for the controversy involving allegations of St Patrick's Athletic fielding ineligible players. St. Pat's originally had 9 points deducted for fielding Paul Marney in the first three games of the season. This was later revoked after arbitration. However Shelbourne appealed against this decision which was taken to the High Court where the appeal was rejected. It was then discovered by the Shelbourne chief executive, Ollie Byrne, that Charles Livingstone Mbabazi had not been registered by St. Pat's for the first five games of the season and so the club had 15 points deducted, three points for each game. The decision of the FAI appeal board to dismiss St. Pat's appeal in the Livingstone case saw Shelbourne confirmed as league champions.

Final table

Results

Matches 1–22

Matches 23–33

Promotion/relegation play-off
Longford Town who finished in ninth place played off against Finn Harps, the third placed team from the 2001–02 League of Ireland First Division.

1st Leg

2nd Leg 

Longford Town win 6-5  on penalties after extra time and retain their place in the Premier Division.

See also
 2001–02 Shelbourne F.C. season
 2001–02 League of Ireland First Division

References

 
Ireland
1
League of Ireland Premier Division seasons